Quercus viminea, the Sonoran oak, or Mexican willow oak, is a North American species of oak. It is native to northwestern and west-central Mexico (Sonora, Chihuahua, Sinaloa, Durango, Nayarit, Jalisco), primarily in the Sierra Madre Occidental. The species range extends just north of the international border into Santa Cruz County in southern Arizona.

Quercus viminea is an evergreen or drought-deciduous tree growing up to 10 metres (33 feet) tall.

References

External links
Arizona Sonoran Desert Museum, Research and Conservation in Southern Sonora, Mexico

viminea
Trees of Northwestern Mexico
Flora of Arizona
Plants described in 1924
Flora of the Sierra Madre Occidental
Oaks of Mexico
Taxa named by William Trelease